Kira Bursky is a filmmaker, screenwriter, and artist currently based out of Asheville, NC.

All Around Artsy was founded in 2009 by Kira Bursky, a vagabonding storyteller with an insatiable hunger for magic. She has produced over 60 films and music videos that have screened at festivals around the world from Los Angeles to Berlin to Beijing. In 2014 Kira was recognized as National YoungArts Finalist and was a finalist in the White House Student Film Festival where she had the honor of screening her work in the White House. In 2015 Kira was selected as the Best Emerging Female Filmmaker at the National Film Festival for Talented Youth (NFFTY). In 2016 she was featured in Seventeen Magazine as the April issue's Power Girl and received the Emerging Artist to Watch grant through Le Couvent artist residency in France. Kira and her creations have been featured through NPR, Out Magazine, Pride and No Film School to name a few. Her YouTube channel has over 34,000+ subscribers and 16 million+ views."Bursky is just 23 years old, but the Asheville filmmaker is already on a trajectory to becoming one of America’s most incisive and distinctive auteurs." – Matt Peiken, Arts Producer BPR + NPR

Background 
Kira Bursky, originally from Upper Nyack, NY, attended Asheville High School's School of Inquiry and Life Sciences program for one year and Evergreen Community Charter School for middle school. She also attended the Carolina Film Institute for one year at age 13.

She later attended high school at the Interlochen Arts Academy in Michigan as a Motion Picture Arts major, graduating in 2014. She worked at documentary filmmaker Morgan Spurlock's New York-based film production company, Warrior Poets, as a post-production intern.

Awards 
Her works have been featured and awarded prizes at over 100 domestic and  international film festivals including the All-American High School Film Festival, the Chicago International Children's Film Festival, the Colchester International Film Festival, Guam International Film Festival, the White House Student Film Festival, Princeton Student Film Festival, and the Cannes Film Festival.

Featured works 

Wild Flowers (2016) - 10 million+ views on YouTube
Tree Hugger (2015) -  4 million+ views on YouTube
Adulthood (2015) - 1 million+ views on YouTube
Period. (2019)
We're Okay (2014)
Closet Made of Sheets (2017)
Demon Pills (2017)
To and From (2016)
Really Looking (2016)
She Once Was Distant (2018)
Fake Emma (2018)
Girly (2013)
Foreshadow (2019)

References 

Living people
American women screenwriters
Interlochen Center for the Arts alumni
Year of birth missing (living people)
21st-century American women